Koos Schouwenaar (9 October 1902 – 22 June 1941) was a Dutch rower. He competed in the men's eight event at the 1928 Summer Olympics. He was killed in action during World War II.

References

External links
 

1902 births
1941 deaths
Dutch male rowers
Olympic rowers of the Netherlands
Rowers at the 1928 Summer Olympics
People from Alblasserdam
Dutch civilians killed in World War II
People lost at sea
Engelandvaarders
Sportspeople from South Holland
20th-century Dutch people